Tephritis oligostictica is a species of tephritid or fruit flies in the genus Tephritis of the family Tephritidae.

Distribution
Syria, Afghanistan.

References

Tephritinae
Insects described in 1971
Diptera of Asia